Telecommunications in Latvia include radio, television, fixed and mobile telephones, and the Internet.

Radio and television 

Radio stations:
 Publicly owned broadcaster operates 6 radio networks with dozens of stations throughout the country; dozens of private broadcasters also operate radio stations (2007);
 AM 1, FM 234 (2016).

Radios: 1.76 million (1997).

The state public radio broadcaster is Latvijas Radio.

Television stations:
 Several national and regional commercial TV stations are foreign-owned, 2 national TV stations are publicly owned; system supplemented by privately owned regional and local TV stations; cable and satellite multi-channel TV services with domestic and foreign broadcasts available (2007);
 44 plus 31 repeaters (1995).

Televisions: 1.22 million (1997).

The state public television broadcaster is Latvijas Televīzija.

Telephones 

Calling code: +371

International call prefix: 00

Main lines:
 ~501,000 lines in use, 97th in the world (2012); 
 ~644,000 lines in use (2007).

Mobile cellular:
 ~2.3 million lines (2012); 
 ~2.2 million lines (2007).

Telephone system: Recent efforts have focused on bringing competition to the telecommunications sector; the number of fixed lines is decreasing as mobile-cellular telephone service expands; the number of telecommunications operators has grown rapidly since the fixed-line market opened to competition in 2003; combined fixed-line and mobile-cellular subscribership is roughly 150 per 100 persons; the Latvian network is now connected via fiber optic cable to Estonia, Finland, and Sweden (2008).

Until 2003 Lattelecom had a monopoly in the fixed telecommunications market. This led to overwhelming use of cellular phones for private customers, fixed lines being requested mostly by companies. In Latvia exist more than 2 million mobile phones but only 644,000 fixed phone connections.

Since the fixed-line voice communication monopoly ended on January 1, 2003, several companies entered the market for fixed voice communication services: Aeronavigācijas serviss, Baltcom TV, Beta Telecom, Latvenergo Tehniskais Centrs, OPTRON, Rigatta, Telecentrs, Telenets, Telekom Baltija, CSC Telecom and Bite Latvija. These voice telephony providers provide services for cheaper foreign calls, as well as local calls. The telecom regulator SPRK tries to provide a competitive environment so that new operators can compete with Lattelecom which owns most of the last-mile connections.

Internet 

Top-level domain: .lv

Internet users:
 1.5 million users, 79,2% of the population, 110th in the world (2015);
 1.1 million users (2007).

Internet hosts:
 359,604 hosts, 58th in the world (2012).

Internet Service Providers: 150+ ISPs (2007).

The Internet in Latvia began to experience significant growth in 1999, as the consolidation of regional Internet providers began to drive down prices for dial-up access. By 2000, there were 75,000 Internet users and about a dozen e-commerce shops in Latvia. Back then the average salary for a web programmer was 500Ls/month. High-speed access costs remained prohibitive; for example, an ADSL service was introduced in July 2000 and planned to charge a monthly fee of 50,00Ls. By 2003, however, only 5.4% of Latvians used the Internet at home, and 60% did not use it at all; those who did instead accessed it in public areas or through their place of work, as high subscription prices for home usage remained a barrier. By 2008, access prices had fallen to 11,90Ls (€17) per month for the Lattelecom ADSL line. By July 2015, 79,2% of the population use internet at home. Latvia has the 7th fastest internet in the world.

Internet censorship and surveillance

There is no OpenNet Initiative (ONI) country profile, but Latvia is shown as no evidence of Internet filtering in all areas for which ONI tests (political, social, conflict/security, and Internet tools) on the ONI global Internet filtering maps.

The constitution and law provide for freedom of speech and of the press. There are no government restrictions on access to the Internet or reports that the government monitors e-mail or Internet chat rooms. Individuals and groups engage in the peaceful expression of views via the Internet, including by e-mail.

In September 2010 the government's Corruption Prevention and Combating Bureau (KNAB), which enforces campaign laws, removed a satirical film, The Last Bear Slayer, from the on-demand playlist of the partially state-owned cable provider, Lattelecom. The KNAB stated that the film might have constituted election advertising. Reporters Without Borders charged that the prohibition constituted improper censorship, but noted it was ineffective because the film was widely available on the Internet.

On June 1, 2014 new subsection 22 of section 19 of Electronic Communications Law  was enforced to enable blocking unlicensed gambling websites. Since then, the Lotteries and Gambling Supervisory Inspection of Latvia  has been maintaining the list of blocked websites.

See also

 Latvian Internet Exchange
 Latvia

References

External links 

Public Utilities Commission
Latvian State Department of Communications
NIC.lv, .lv domain registrar.
CERT.lv, the Information Technology Security Incident Response Institution of the Republic of Latvia.

Telecommunications operators in Latvia
TelTel
Bite Latvia (GSM)
CSC Telecom
Lattelecom
Latvia Mobile Telephone (GSM)
Optron
Tele2 (GSM)
TELEFANT
Telepele, prefix code 1030 in Lattelecom network.
Triatel (CDMA)